This article discusses women who have made an important contribution to the field of physics.

Nobel Laureates 

 1903 Marie Curie: "in recognition of the extraordinary services they have rendered by their joint researches on the radiation phenomena discovered by Professor Henri Becquerel" 
 1963 Maria Goeppert Mayer: "for their discoveries concerning nuclear shell structure" 
 2018 Donna Strickland: "for their method high-intensity, ultra-short optical pulses" 
 2020 Andrea Ghez: "for the discovery of a supermassive compact object at the centre of our galaxy."

Four women have won the Nobel Prize in Physics, awarded annually since 1901 by the Royal Swedish Academy of Sciences. Marie Curie was the first woman to receive the prize  in 1903, along with Pierre Curie and Henri Becquerel - making her the only woman to be awarded two Nobel prizes (her second Nobel prize was in Chemistry in 1911). Maria Goeppert Mayer became the second woman to win the prize in 1963, for her contributions to understanding the nuclear shell structure. Donna Strickland was the third winner of the prize in 2018, for her work in high-intensity, ultra-short optical pulses beginning in the 1980s with Gérard Mourou. Andrea Ghez was the fourth Nobel laureate in 2020, she shared one half of the prize with Reinhard Genzel for the discovery of the supermassive compact object Sagittarius A* at the center of our galaxy, the other half awarded to Roger Penrose for theoretical work regarding black hole formation.

Timeline of women in physics 
1668: After separating from her husband, French polymath Marguerite de la Sablière established a popular salon in Paris. Scientists and scholars from different countries visited the salon regularly to discuss ideas and share knowledge, and Sablière studied physics, astronomy and natural history with her guests.

18th Century 
1732: At the age of 20, Italian physicist Laura Bassi became the first female member of the Bologna Academy of Sciences. One month later, she publicly defended her academic theses and received a PhD. Bassi was awarded an honorary position as professor of physics at the University of Bologna. She was the first female physics professor in the world.
1738: French polymath Émilie du Châtelet became the first woman to have a paper published by the Paris Academy, following a contest on the nature of fire.
1740: Émilie du Châtelet published Institutions de Physique, or Foundations of Physics, providing a metaphysical basis for Newtonian physics.
1751: 19-year-old Italian physicist Cristina Roccati received her PhD from the University of Bologna.
1776: At the University of Bologna, Italian physicist Laura Bassi became the first woman appointed as chair of physics at a university.

19th Century 
1816: French mathematician and physicist Sophie Germain became the first women to win a prize from the Paris Academy of Sciences for her work on elasticity theory.
1840: English mathematician Ada Lovelace published the first computer algorithm in a study named "note G".
1897: American physicist Isabelle Stone became the first woman to receive a PhD in physics in the United States. She wrote her dissertation "On the Electrical Resistance of Thin Films" at the University of Chicago.
1898: Danish physicist Kirstine Meyer was awarded the gold medal of the Royal Danish Academy of Sciences and Letters.
1899: Irish physicist Edith Anne Stoney was appointed a physics lecturer at the London School of Medicine for Women, becoming the first woman medical physicist. She later became a pioneering figure in the use of x-ray machines on the front lines of World War I.
1899: American physicists Marcia Keith and Isabelle Stone became charter members of the American Physical Society.

20th Century

1900s
1903: Marie Curie was the first woman to receive a Nobel Prize; she received the Nobel Prize in Physics along with her husband, Pierre Curie "for their joint researches on the radiation phenomena discovered by Professor Henri Becquerel", and Henri Becquerel, "for his discovery of spontaneous radioactivity".
1900: Physicists Marie Curie and Isabelle Stone attended the first International Congress of Physics in Paris, France. They were the only two women out of 836 participants.
1906: English physicist, mathematician and engineer Hertha Ayrton became the first female recipient of the Hughes Medal from the Royal Society of London. She received the award for her experimental research on electric arcs and sand ripples.
1909: Danish physicist Kristine Meyer became the first Danish woman to receive a doctorate degree in natural sciences. She wrote her dissertation on the topic of "the development of the temperature concept" within the history of physics.

1910s
1911: Polish-born physicist and chemist Marie Curie became the first woman to receive the Nobel Prize in Chemistry, which she received "[for] the discovery of the elements radium and polonium, by the isolation of radium and the study of the nature and compounds of this remarkable element". This made her the only woman to win two Nobel Prizes.
1918: Emmy Noether created Noether's theorem explaining the connection between symmetry and conservation laws.

1920s
1925: Astronomer and astrophysicist Cecilia Payne-Gaposchkin established that hydrogen is the most common element in stars, and thus the most abundant element in the universe.
1926: Katharine Burr Blodgett was the first women to earn a Ph.D. in physics from the University of Cambridge.
1926: The first application of Quantum Mechanics to molecular systems was done by Lucy Mensing. She studied the rotational spectrum of diatomic molecules using the methods of matrix mechanics.

1930s
1936: Danish seismologist and geophysicist Inge Lehmann discovered that the Earth has a solid inner core distinct from its molten outer core.
1937: Marietta Blau and her student Hertha Wambacher, both Austrian physicists, received the Lieben Prize of the Austrian Academy of Sciences for their work on cosmic ray observations using the technique of nuclear emulsions.
1939: Lise Meitner helped lead a small group of scientists who first discovered the nuclear fission of uranium when it absorbed an extra neutron.
1939: French physicist Marguerite Perey discovered francium.

1940s
1941: Ruby Payne-Scott joined the Radio Physics Laboratory of the  Australia Government's CSIRO; she was the first woman radio astronomer.
1945: American physicists and mathematicians Frances Spence, Ruth Teitelbaum, Marlyn Meltzer, Betty Holberton, Jean Bartik and Kathleen Antonelli programmed the electronic general-purpose computer ENIAC, becoming some of the world's first computer programmers.
1947: Berta Karlik, an Austrian physicist, was awarded the Haitinger Prize of the Austrian Academy of Sciences for her discovery of Astatine
1949: Rosemary Brown (later Fowler), a student of C.F. Powell in Bristol, discovers the k-meson in what Heisenberg calls "most beautiful" pictures of cosmic ray tracks from the Jungfraujoch (the 'k' track in Brown, R. et al. Nature, 163, 47 (1949). This discovery and the prior finding of a very similar particle in 1947 led to the "τ–θ puzzle", the discovery of parity violation in weak interactions, and hence the Standard Model.

1950s
1952: Photograph 51, an X-ray diffraction image of crystallized DNA, was taken by Raymond Gosling in May 1952, working as a PhD student under the supervision of British chemist and biophysicist Rosalind Franklin; it was critical evidence in identifying the structure of DNA.
1956: Chinese-American physicist Chien-Shiung Wu conducted a nuclear physics experiment in collaboration with the Low Temperature Group of the US National Bureau of Standards. The experiment, becoming known as the Wu experiment, showed that parity could be violated in weak interaction.

1960s 
1960: American medical physicist Rosalyn Yalow received the Nobel Prize in Physiology or Medicine "for the development of radioimmunoassays of peptide hormones" along with Roger Guillemin and Andrew V. Schally who received it "for their discoveries concerning the peptide hormone production of the brain".
1962: French physicist Marguerite Perey became the first female Fellow elected to the Académie des Sciences.
1963: Maria Goeppert Mayer became the first American woman to receive a Nobel Prize in Physics; she shared the prize with J. Hans D. Jensen "for their discoveries concerning nuclear shell structure” and Eugene Paul Wigner "for his contributions to the theory of the atomic nucleus and the elementary particles, particularly through the discovery and application of fundamental symmetry principles".
1964: Chien-Shiung Wu spoke at MIT about gender discrimination.
1967: Astrophysicist Jocelyn Bell Burnell co-discovered the first radio pulsars.

1970s 
1971 Mina Rees became the first woman president of American Association for the Advancement of Science (AAAS) founded in 1848.
1972: Willie Hobbs Moore became the first African-American woman to receive a Ph.D. in physics.
1972: Sandra Faber became the first woman to join the Lick Observatory staff at the University of California, Santa Cruz.
1973: American physicist Anna Coble became the first African-American woman to receive a PhD in biophysics, completing her dissertation at University of Illinois.
1978: Chien-Shiung Wu was awarded the Wolf Prize in Physics for her help with the development of the Standard Model.

1980s 
1980: Nigerian geophysicist Deborah Ajakaiye became the first woman in any West African country to be appointed a full professor of physics. Over the course of her scientific career, she became the first female Fellow elected to the Nigerian Academy of Science, and the first female dean of science in Nigeria.
1985: Mildred Dresselhaus was appointed the first women Institute Professor at MIT
1986: Maria Goeppert Mayer Award was awarded for the first time to honor young female physicists at the beginning of their careers
1986 Jean M. Bennett became the first woman president of The Optical Society founded in 1916.

1990s 
1995: Reva Williams works out the Penrose process for rotating black holes.
2000: Mildred Dresselhaus became the director of the Office of Science at the United States Department of Energy.
2000: Venezuelan astrophysicist Kathy Vivas presented her discovery of approximately 100 "new and very distant" RR Lyrae stars, providing insight into the structure and history of the Milky Way galaxy.

21st Century

2000s 
2001: Lene Hau stopped a beam of light completely
2003: American geophysicist Claudia Alexander oversaw the final stages of Project Galileo, a space exploration mission that ended at the planet Jupiter.
2003: Deborah S. Jin and her team were the first to condense pairs of fermionic atoms
2007: Physicist Ibtesam Badhrees was the first Saudi Arabian woman to become a member of the European Organization for Nuclear Research (CERN).

2010s 
2011: Taiwanese-American astrophysicist Chung-Pei Ma led a team of scientists in discovering two of the largest black holes ever observed.
2013: Nashwa Eassa founded the NGO Sudanese Women in Sciences.
2014: American theoretical physicist Shirley Anne Jackson was awarded the National Medal of Science. Jackson had been the first African-American woman to receive a PhD from the Massachusetts Institute of Technology (MIT) during the early 1970s, and the first woman to chair the U.S. Nuclear Regulatory Commission.
2015: Rabia Salihu Sa'id received the Elsevier Foundation Award for Women Scientist in the Developing World.
2016: Fabiola Gianotti became the first woman Director-General of CERN (European Organization for Nuclear Research)
2018: British astrophysicists Hiranya Peiris and Joanna Dunkley and Italian cosmologist Licia Verde were among 27 scientists awarded the Breakthrough Prize in Fundamental Physics for their contributions to "detailed maps of the early universe that greatly improved our knowledge of the evolution of the cosmos and the fluctuations that seeded the formation of galaxies".
 2018: British astrophysicist Jocelyn Bell Burnell received the special Breakthrough Prize in Fundamental Physics for her scientific achievements and “inspiring leadership”, worth $3 million. She donated the entirety of the prize money towards the creation of scholarships to assist women, underrepresented minorities and refugees who are pursuing the study of physics.
2018: Canadian physicist Donna Strickland received the Nobel Prize in Physics "for groundbreaking inventions in the field of laser physics"; she shared it with Arthur Ashkin and Gérard Mourou.
2018: For the first time in history, women received the Nobel Prize in Chemistry and the Nobel Prize in Physics in the same year.
2019: Mathematician Karen Uhlenbeck became the first woman to win the Abel Prize for "her pioneering achievements in geometric partial differential equations, gauge theory, and integrable systems, and for the fundamental impact of her work on analysis, geometry and mathematical physics."

2020s 
2020: American  astrophysicist Andrea M. Ghez received the Nobel Prize in Physics "for the discovery of a supermassive compact object at the centre of our galaxy." She shared half of the prize with Reinhard Genzel, while the other half was awarded to Roger Penrose.
2022: French-Swedish physicist Anne L’Huillier received the Wolf Prize in Physics “for pioneering contributions to ultrafast laser science and attosecond physics”.

See also 
Timeline of women in science
Timeline of women in science in the United States
Women in science
Women in the workforce

References 

Lists of women scientists
Physics